Joakim "Jocke" Nyström (born 20 February 1963) is a former top ten ranked tennis player from Sweden who won 13 singles titles during his professional career. The right-hander reached his highest singles ranking on the ATP Tour on 31 March 1986, when he was ranked world No. 7. He was also ranked world No. 4 in doubles that same year.

Tennis career
He was a singles quarterfinalist at both the French Open (1985) and US Open (1985, 1986) tournaments, the 1986 Wimbledon doubles champion with Mats Wilander, and a member of the winning 1985 and 1987 Davis Cup teams from Sweden. He qualified for The Masters year-end singles tournament in 1984, 1985, and 1986.

Nystrom was part of the generation of outstanding Swedish players in the 1980s and early 1990s, which included Anders Järryd, Jonas Svensson, Mikael Pernfors, Kent Carlsson, Stefan Edberg, Henrik Sundström, and Mats Wilander.

Since retiring from tennis, Nyström has served as Fed Cup captain for Sweden and as an assistant coach to Wilander with the Swedish Davis Cup team. Outside these commitments, he coached both Finn Jarkko Nieminen and Austrian Jürgen Melzer.
Jack Sock has also hired him as his coach. He coached Kamil Majchrzak from December 2020 till August 2022.

Singles performance timeline

Career finals

Singles: 18 (13 titles, 5 runner-ups)

Doubles: 20 (8 titles, 12 runner-ups)

References

External links
 
 
 

1963 births
Living people
Swedish male tennis players
Swedish tennis coaches
Grand Slam (tennis) champions in men's doubles
People from Skellefteå Municipality
Wimbledon champions
Sportspeople from Västerbotten County